Addie Pryor (born 1 March 1929) is a British alpine skier. She competed in two events at the 1956 Winter Olympics.

References

1929 births
Living people
British female alpine skiers
Olympic alpine skiers of Great Britain
Alpine skiers at the 1956 Winter Olympics
Sportspeople from London